James McGinn (27 June 1868 – 1932) was a Scottish footballer who played in the Football League for Bolton Wanderers.

References

1868 births
1932 deaths
Scottish footballers
English Football League players
Association football forwards
Celtic F.C. players
Airdrieonians F.C. (1878) players
Bolton Wanderers F.C. players